Josef Prorok (born 16 November 1987 in Prague) is a Czech track and field athlete who specialises in the 400 metres hurdles. He participated in his first Olympic Games in London in 2012.

Achievements

References
 

1987 births
Living people
Czech male hurdlers
Olympic athletes of the Czech Republic
Athletes (track and field) at the 2012 Summer Olympics
Athletes from Prague